Golf Green is a neighbourhood located in the southern part of Kolkata, in West Bengal, India. The neighbourhood derives its name from the Royal Calcutta Golf Club, which is located in the vicinity.

References

Neighbourhoods in Kolkata